Calcium malate is a compound with formula Ca(C2H4O(COO)2). It is the calcium salt of malic acid.  As a food additive, it has the E number E352.

It is related to, but different from, calcium citrate malate.

References

Malates
Calcium compounds
E-number additives